Magic City may refer to:

Cities

Italy 
 Turin

United States 
 Barberton, Ohio
 Billings, Montana
 Birmingham, Alabama
 Bogalusa, Louisiana
 Cheyenne, Wyoming
 Endicott, New York
 Florence, South Carolina
 Orlando, Florida
 Miami, Florida
 Middlesboro, Kentucky
 Minot, North Dakota
 Moberly, Missouri
 Muncie, Indiana
 Roanoke, Virginia
 South Omaha, Nebraska
 Tulsa, Oklahoma
 Charleroi, Pennsylvania

Art and entertainment

Music

Albums
 Magic City (MC Magic album), 2006
 Magic City (P-Money album), 2004
 The Magic City (Helium album), 1997
 The Magic City (Sun Ra album), 1966

Songs
 "Magic City", by 2XL from Neighborhood Rapstar
 "Magic City", by Buju Banton from Rasta Got Soul
 "Magic City", by Fivio Foreign from B.I.B.L.E.
 "Magic City", by Gorillaz from The Now Now
 "Magic City", by Yngwie Malmsteen from Perpetual Flame

Other art and entertainment
 Magic City (TV series), a 2012 American TV series
 The Magic City (novel), a 1910 novel by Edith Nesbit
 Magic City, a fresco by Jean-Michel Folon inside the Montgomery metro station, Brussels, Belgium
 "Magic City", a short story by Nelson S. Bond included in the collection The Far Side of Nowhere
 The Magic City, a film by Antonello Padovano

Sports
 Magic City Misfits (MCM), a roller derby league based in Jacksonville, Florida, US
 Magic City Snowbears, a defunct professional basketball club based in Minot, North Dakota, US

Venues and enterprises 
 Magic-City, an amusement park in Paris, France
 Magic City (club), a strip club in Atlanta, Georgia, US

See also 
 
 Magic Town, a 1947 American film